Chiniquy is a surname. Notable people with the name include:

Charles Chiniquy (1809–1899), Canadian Catholic priest who left the Catholic Church and became a Presbyterian minister. He rode the lecture circuit in the United States denouncing the Catholic Church warning of "plots by the Vatican" to take control of the United States
Gerry Chiniquy (1912–1989), American film animator